is a train station on the Kyoto Municipal Subway Tōzai Line in Nakagyō-ku ward, city of Kyoto, Kyoto Prefecture, Japan.

Layout
The underground station has an island platform with two tracks.

History
 January 16, 2008 – Station begins operation as the Tōzai Line extension from Nijō to Uzumasa Tenjingawa completed.

References

Railway stations in Kyoto Prefecture
Railway stations in Japan opened in 2008